1983 United States Grand Prix may refer to:
1983 Detroit Grand Prix
1983 United States Grand Prix West